Waxing is a temporary method of hair removal, which removes the hair from the root, including:
Bikini waxing
Male genital waxing

Waxing may also refer to:

Waxing, any method of applying wax to a surface as a lubricant or to improve traction
Ski wax
Surfboard wax
Oil waxing
Fruit waxing, a process of covering fresh fruit with wax to prevent water loss and retard shrinkage and spoilage
Waxing moon, a lunar phase of the moon when it is approaching fullness (as opposed to waning)